City Airways Limited, trading as Brighton City Airways, was a short-lived British virtual airline that sold tickets for one route, Shoreham Airport (West Sussex) to Cormeilles Aerodrome, Pontoise,   north west of Paris, France, between March 2013 and May 2013.

As a virtual and unlicensed airline the route was operated by Van Air Europe.

History
Brighton City Airways was launched in November 2012 as a trading name for City Airways Limited. The company commenced operations on 6 March 2013. Van Air Europe, a Czech airline, operated a Let L-410 Turbolet, a small 19-seater commuter aircraft, to operate the route on behalf of Brighton City Airways.

Service commenced on 6 March 2013 and was suspended on 6 May 2013 with no date for a resumption of flights. The company indicated that the suspension was due to "ongoing French Customs and Immigration delays in setting up a point of entry at Paris Pontoise airport". The flights had been obliged to land at a customs airport in France first to clear customs, usually Rouen Airport or Le Touquet – Côte d'Opale Airport.

References

Travel and holiday companies of the United Kingdom
Companies based in Sussex